Panjkosi is a village in the Western part of Punjab, India.

Villages in Fazilka district